Mehrbani Peak is a mountain in Naltar Valley in the Gilgit District of Gilgit–Baltistan territory of Pakistan. It lies to the northwest of Naltar Peak (4,678 m) and to the south of Snow Dome peak (5,029 m) (there is another Snow Dome peak near Concordia). The peak is also known as Khaitar Peak.

References

External links
 Northern Pakistan detailed placemarks in Google Earth

Five-thousanders of the Karakoram
Mountains of Gilgit-Baltistan